Rowland Phillips (born 23 January 1994) is a Jamaican tennis player.

Phillips has a career high ATP singles ranking of 1269 achieved on 19 August 2019. He also has a career high ATP doubles ranking of 1139 achieved on 17 February 2020.

Phillips represents Jamaica at the Davis Cup, where he has a W/L record of 27–16.

Personal life
Phillips is a grandson of Rowland Phillips, the former Chief Justice of Jamaica.

World Tennis Tour and Challenger finals

Doubles: 1 (0-1)

Davis Cup

Participations: (27–16)

   indicates the outcome of the Davis Cup match followed by the score, date, place of event, the zonal classification and its phase, and the court surface.

References

External links
 
 
 

1994 births
Living people
Jamaican male tennis players
Tennis players at the 2019 Pan American Games
Pan American Games competitors for Jamaica